Cystiscus subauriculatus is a species of very small sea snail, a marine gastropod mollusk or micromollusk in the family Cystiscidae.

References

Cystiscidae
Gastropods described in 1915
Subauriculatus